KTJK (101.7 FM, "The Raider") is a variety hits radio station serving the area around Abilene, Texas and licensed to nearby Hawley.

History 
KTJK began airing content under a new commercial license in late winter 2018, adopting its current variety hits format after a seasonal broadcast of all Christmas music. The license and equipment was purchased in spring 2021 by WesTex Telco. KTJK is held by local community ownership and is operated by local staff.

Branding 
The station's identity as "101.7 The Raider" is a direct reference to the presence of Dyess Air Force Base in the local community. The United States Air Force has announced Dyess AFB as one of the operational bases of the under-development US heavy bomber, the Northrop Grumman B-21 Raider.

References

External links

TJK
2018 establishments in Texas
Radio stations established in 2018